Canal+ Domo  is a Polish television channel owned and operated by Canal+.

On 1 December 2020, a Czech-language version was launched on Skylink, named Canal+ Domo. It have the same programming but it is commercial-free. The Polish Domo+ became Canal+ Domo on 15 April 2021.

See also 
 Canal+ Kuchnia

References

External links
www.domoplus.pl

Television channels in Poland
Television channels and stations established in 2008
Canal+ Premium